WayV (威神V) is a Chinese boy group.

WAYV may also refer to:

 WAYV (radio station), an American radio station in New Jersey